Blacé is a commune of the Rhône department in eastern France. It was the retirement home of Adolphe Valette.

See also
Communes of the Rhône department

References

External links

Geneawiki.fr Blacé (in French)

Communes of Rhône (department)
Rhône communes articles needing translation from French Wikipedia
Beaujolais (province)